Kune is a dialect of Bininj Kunwok, an Australian Aboriginal language. The Aboriginal people who speak Kune are the Bininj people, who live primarily in western Arnhem Land. Kune is spoken primarily in the south-east of the Bininj Kunwok speaking areas, particularly in the Cadell River district south of Maningrida. This includes outstations such as Korlobidahdah, Buluhkaduru and Bolkdjam. Grammatically Kune is closely related to other varieties of Bininj Kunwok, however there are many differences in vocabulary.

References

Further reading 
 , 2 volumes

External links
Bininj Kunwok online dictionary

Kunwok

Gunwinyguan languages
Arnhem Land
Indigenous Australian languages in the Northern Territory